Badminton at the 2022 European Youth Summer Olympic Festival is holding from 25 to 30 July. The events took place at the Sports Park Badminton in Banská Bystrica, Slovakia.

Start list 
73 players from 37 countries competing badminton event.

Medalists

Medal table

Medalists

Boys' singles

Seeds 

 Mateusz Gołaś (bronze medalist)
 Pascal Lin Cheng (bronze medalist)
 Roko Pipunić (group stage)
 Romeo Makboul (silver medalist)
 Harper Leigh (round of 16)
 Luis Pongratz (quarter-finals)
 Noah Warning (quarter-finals)
 Arnaud Huberty (round of 16)

Group 1

Group 2

Group 3

Group 4

Group 5

Group 6

Group 7

Group 8

Finals

Girls' singles

Seeds 

 Johanka Ivanovičová (withdrew, substituted by Lea Kyselicová)
 Maja Janko (quarter-finals)
 Lucie Krulová (quarter-finals)
 Ravza Bodur (silver medalist)
 Nella Nyqvist (gold medalist)
 Jelena Buchberger (round of 16)
 Leila Zarrouk (quarter-finals)
 Petra Hart (round of 16)

Group 1

Group 2

Group 3

Group 4

Group 5

Group 6

Group 7

Group 8

Finals

Mixed doubles

Seeds 

 Pascal Lin Cheng / Anja Rumpold (third round)
 Arnaud Huberty / Amber Boonen (third round)
 Mats Duwel / Flora Wang (quarter-finals)
 Matúš Poláček / Johanka Ivanovičová (withdrew, substituted by Lea Kyselicová)
 Csanád Horváth / Petra Hart (third round)
 Buğra Aktaş / Ravza Bodur (gold medalists)
 Salomon Thomasen / Maria Tommerup (bronze medalists)
 Luis Pongratz / Marie Stern (bronze medalists)

Finals

Top half

Section 1

Section 2

Bottom half

Section 3

Section 4

References 

European Youth Summer Olympic Festival
2022 European Youth Summer Olympic Festival
Badminton tournaments in Slovakia
2022